Bulevirtide, sold under the brand name Hepcludex, is an antiviral medication for the treatment of chronic hepatitis D (in the presence of hepatitis B).

The most common side effects include raised levels of bile salts in the blood and reactions at the site of injection.

Bulevirtide works by attaching to and blocking a receptor (target) through which the hepatitis delta and hepatitis B viruses enter liver cells. By blocking the entry of the virus into the cells, it limits the ability of HDV to replicate and its effects in the body, reducing symptoms of the disease.

Bulevirtide was approved for medical use in the European Union in July 2020.

Structural formula
Bulevirtide is a 47-amino acid peptide with the following sequence:

CH3(CH2)12CO-Gly-Thr-Asn-Leu-Ser-Val-Pro-Asn-Pro-Leu-Gly-Phe-Phe-Pro-Asp-His-Gln-Leu-Asp-Pro-Ala-Phe-Gly-Ala-Asn-Ser-Asn-Asn-Pro-Asp-Trp-Asp-Phe-Asn-Pro-Asn-Lys-Asp-His-Trp-Pro-Glu-Ala-Asn-Lys-Val-Gly-NH2 (C13H27CO-GTNLSVPNPLGFFPDHQLDPAFGANSNNPDWDFNPNKDHWPEANKVG-NH2)

Medical uses
Bulevirtide is indicated for the treatment of chronic hepatitis delta virus (HDV) infection in plasma (or serum) HDV-RNA positive adult patients with compensated liver disease.

Pharmacology

Mechanism of action
Bulevirtide binds and inactivates the sodium/bile acid cotransporter, blocking both viruses from entering hepatocytes.

The hepatitis B virus uses its surface lipopeptide pre-S1 for docking to mature liver cells via their sodium/bile acid cotransporter (NTCP) and subsequently entering the cells. Myrcludex B is a synthetic N-acylated pre-S1 that can also dock to NTCP, blocking the virus's entry mechanism.

The drug is also effective against hepatitis D because the hepatitis D virus is only effective in the presence of a hepatitis B virus infection.

References

External links 
 

Anti–RNA virus drugs
Viral hepatitis
Orphan drugs
Entry inhibitors